Tewkesbury Town Council is a local council covering the parish of Tewkesbury, Gloucestershire. It is a successor parish to the Tewkesbury Municipal Borough Council that existed prior to the reorganisation of English Local Government in April 1974. The Town Council in its original form was constituted by the Local Government (Successor Parishes) Order 1973, where Tewkesbury Town is listed in Schedule Part 1.

History

Creation of Tewkesbury Town Council
Tewkesbury Town Council, in its current form as Tewkesbury Parish Council, met informally for the first time on 19 November 1973. It met formally for the first time on 17 December 1973, during this meeting which Councillor C. Burd was appointed as Chairman until 1 April 1974. During 19 November 1973 meeting it was resolved that the Council should have the status of a Town Council from 1 April 1974. This status does not result in additional powers or funding but in accordance Section 245 (6) of the Local Government Act 1972 has the effect of styling the Chairman/Vice-Chairman of the Council as Town Mayor and Deputy Town Mayor respectively.

During the meeting of 17 December 1973 it was agreed that there was no objection to the use by the new Tewkesbury Borough Council of the Borough Coat of Arms. It was also agreed that the insignia for Tewkesbury which predated the coat of arms would be the new Town Council's coat of arms which are still used by the Council.

History between 1974 and 1980

Tewkesbury Town Council began its formal role as the Parish Council for Tewkesbury in April 1974. The first chairman of Tewkesbury Parish Council was Councillor C. Burd who was also the first Town Mayor of the post 1974 Town Council. All of the six Town Mayors who served between 1974 and 1980 are outlined along with the year of service in Table 1.

There were a number of Miscellaneous Provisions which needed to be resolved following the formation of the new Tewkesbury Borough and the new Town Council which were intended to be resolved by a statutory instrument made in April 1977. In April 1977 the Town Council received a number of properties from Tewkesbury Borough Council through the provisions of The Local Authorities etc. (Miscellaneous Provision) Order 1977. These properties included the Town Hall, Severn Ham SSSI, fishing rights, land at the Mythe Railway Nature Reserve and the lordship of the manor of Tewkesbury. Some of these properties have since been disposed of by the Town Council.

History between 1980 and 1990

The Town Mayors during this time are outlined along with the year of service in Table 2.

The land at the Mythe Railway Nature Reserve which had been received from Tewkesbury Borough Council in April 1977 through the provisions of The Local Authorities etc. (Miscellaneous Provision) Order 1977 became the property of the Gloucestershire Wildlife Trust in 1985.

History between 1990 and 2000

The Town Mayors during this time are outlined along with the year of service in Table 3.

During the 1990s the relationship between the town of Tewkesbury, Gloucestershire and Tewksbury, Massachusetts was strengthened and the possibility of a formal twinning was investigated. A formal twinning arrangement between the two towns was not progressed during the 1990s although a link was maintained during this time. The relationship between these two towns resulted in the placing of the Miko Kaufman sculpture called Touching Souls at Tewkesbury Abbey.

History between 2000 and 2010

The Town Mayors during this time are outlined along with the year of service in the Table 4.

Since January 2003 there has been a special relationship between Tewkesbury, Gloucestershire and Tewksbury Township, New Jersey.

History since 2010

The Town Mayors during this time are outlined along with the year of service in Table 5. Tewkesbury Town Council has experienced a number of challenges between 2010 and the present day. Tewkesbury Town Council has also taken on additional responsibilities since 2010 including assuming ownership of two new toilet blocks in Gloucester Road and Oldbury Road in 2013.

Extent of Tewkesbury Town

Since the creation of Tewkesbury Town Council, the boundaries of the Parish have slightly changed most notably to cover part of the Newtown area which was formerly part of Ashchurch Parish. The M5 motorway forms part of the eastern boundary of the Town and the western side of junction 9 is within the parish. Within Tewkesbury Town are the Town Centre and the areas of Newtown, Priors Park, Mitton, Tewkesbury Park, Upper Lode, Stonehills and the Mythe. The Wheatpeices estate, Northway, and Ashchurch are not part of the Tewkesbury Town Council area but are covered by their own Parish Councils.

Tewkesbury Town Clerk and Responsible Financial Officer

Tewkesbury Town Council as a Parish Council is required to appoint a Proper Officer and Responsible Finance Officer. As is the case with many Parish and Town Council's the Proper Officer is titled as the Town Clerk. There have as of February 2021 been eight Permanent Clerks of Tewkesbury Town Council including the Acting Clerk Mr F. Broxton. The current Clerk, Debbie Hill is assisted by an Assistant Clerk - Jen King.

Tewkesbury Town Hall

The Town Council is based at Tewkesbury Town Hall located at 18, High Street, Tewkesbury, Gloucestershire: it is a Grade II* building.

Deaths in Office of Tewkesbury Town Councillors

Despite Tewkesbury Town Council having been in operation since 1974 only five Councillors have died whilst holding public office. The names of Tewkesbury Town Councillors who have died in office are listed in Table 7.

Population of the Parish of Tewkesbury Town

At the time of the 2011 Census, the population of the Parish was 10,704  residents. This places Tewkesbury Town as the 492nd largest Parish or Community Council in the United Kingdom. The population of Tewkesbury Town is between that of Amesbury and Birchwood Parishes.

Membership of Tewkesbury Town Council

The Town Council is currently made up of sixteen councillors who serve a population of 10,704 according to the figures released from the 2011 census. The Town Councillors formerly represented four wards of Mythe, Priors Park, Tewkesbury Town with Mitton and Newtown. The number of wards was reduced to three wards of Tewkesbury North, Tewkesbury South and Newtown at the time of the last ordinary election in May 2019.

Elections to Tewkesbury Town Council last took place in May 2019 and councillors have been co-opted since the last election. Table 8 lists the current Town Councillors grouped by the Ward they represent.

The next elections to Tewkesbury Town Council are due to take place in May 2013. These elections will occur at the same time as the ordinary elections for Tewkesbury Borough Council.

Community Service Award

Since 1983 Tewkesbury Town Council has given a community service award to individuals who have made a significant contribution to the live of the Town. As of 14 May 2018 the Town Council has made this award to sixty individuals. All individuals given this award are noted on a board on the wall of the Town Hall. These awards are presented at the Annual Meeting of the Town Council which is also known as the Mayor Making Ceremony. Those listed in Table 9 have received the Community Service Award from Tewkesbury Town Council.

See also 
Parish councils in England

References

Parish councils of England
Local precepting authorities in England
Local authorities in Gloucestershire
Town Council